Football Club Union Sportive Ambert is a football club located in Ambert, France. Founded in the early 1920s, they play in the Régional 2, the seventh tier of French football. The colours of the club are blue and white.

The highest tier Ambert has played in is the Division 4, which they reached in the 1990–91 season. Ambert notably reached the round of 64 of the Coupe de France in the 1994–95 edition of the tournament, but were eliminated by Nancy after 1–0 loss.

Honours

Notable former players 

  Titi Camara
  Othniel Dossevi

References

External links 

 Club website
Sport in Puy-de-Dôme
Football clubs in France
1921 establishments in France
Association football clubs established in 1921